Nils Franzén  (born 11 December 1910, died 1985) was a Swedish politician. He was a member of the Centre Party.

References
This article was initially translated from the Swedish Wikipedia article.

Centre Party (Sweden) politicians
1910 births
1985 deaths
20th-century Swedish politicians